Andhimul Temple is a Hindu temple located in Satsarai Vidhan of Anbu Khaireni Rural Municipality. The temple was constructed in 2035 B.S. and a Shivalinga was established in the temple in 2054  BS. 

The temple has a pagoda shape. There are two ponds near the temple. Pilgrims from various parts of the country, including Tanhun, Kaski, Gorkha and Lamjung pays visit to the temple.  They feed pigeons and sacrifice goats and chickens. 

The temple is open all days except on the month of Shrawan and on no moon days.

Mythology
According to the legend, when a grandmother came with her granddaughter to this place to graze cows, the granddaughter felt thirsty. While searching for water, she secretly found water in this place and quenched her thirst. It is believed that in the Magh language, Aan means thirst and Dhi means water, hence the place was called Andimul.

According to another legend, when Cheli was coming to Mawli in ancient times, a storm appeared when he reached at the middle of the forest. To avoid the storm, they stayed in the cave near the arch tree at this place. Later, in a dream, a relative was ordered to worship at the base of a tree and burn incense on the full moon day. While excavating the place that he saw in the dream, a source of water emanating from the base of the same tree started and formed a pond. It is believed that the local people have been worshipping the  Andimul and the pond then after.

See also
List of Hindu temples in Nepal

References

Hindu temples in Gandaki Province
Buildings and structures in Tanahun District